The 2013 Good Times Bonspiel was held from September 6 to 8 at the Calgary Curling Club in Calgary, Alberta as part of the 2013–14 World Curling Tour. It was the first ever edition of the event. Both the men's and women's events were held in a double knockout format. The purse for both the men's and the women's events was CAD$8,000 each.

The Terry Meek rink from Calgary won the men's event, defeating Bert Martin's rink from Airdrie. Lloyd Hill, also from Calgary, won the consolation event.

On the women's side, 2010 Olympic silver medalist Cheryl Bernard and her rink from Calgary defeated Jocelyn Peterman's team from Red Deer. Crystal Webster's rink, also from Calgary won the consolation event.

Teams entered

Men
The teams were as follows:

Women

The teams were as follows:

References

External links

Good Times Bonspiel
Sport in Calgary
Curling in Alberta
Good Times Bonspiel
Good Times Bonspiel